Valerio Scanu Live in Roma is a limited edition CD and DVD album by the Italian singer Valerio Scanu. It was released on June 11, 2013. The album was recorded live. The album is a recording of a December 17, 2012, Christmas concert at the Auditorium Parco della Musica in Sala Sinopoli, Rome.

During the concert, Scanu sang songs from his own albums, and cover versions, mostly in English. He also performed two duets with singers Ivana Spagna and Silvia Olari. The project was funded and organized by Scanu and by the publishing house he had recently founded, "NatyLoveYou", which became his official publishing house after a break-up with his former publisher. The project was distributed through Self Distribuzione, the largest independent distributor of Italian recordings.

Track list of CD

Track list of DVD

Band 
For the live concert held in Rome, Valerio Scanu was accompanied by the following musicians:
 Martino Onorato: piano and musical director
 Stefano Profazi: guitar
 Roberto Lo Monaco: bass guitar
 Alessandro Pizzonia: drums
 Chorus : Sara Corbò, Lucy Campeti, Daniele Grammaldo.

References 

2013 live albums
Valerio Scanu albums